Breiðamerkurjökull is an outlet glacier of the larger glacier of Vatnajökull and a piedmont glacier in the southern part of Vatnajökull National Park, Iceland.  Emerging as a tongue of the Vatnajökull, it ends in a small lagoon, known as Jökulsárlón. Over time, it has gradually been breaking down.

As the icebergs break away from the tongue of the glacier, they drift slowly to the mouth of the lagoon and eventually join the ocean. They are stated to float in the deep lagoon for 5 years, which is around 300 m deep and spreads over an area of 17 km². It was near the ring road until 35 years ago before retreating rapidly and forming the Jökulsárlón lagoon. The 752 m high Breiðamerkurfjall  Glacier was enclosed by the Breiðamerkurjökull and Fjallsjökull  before the drifting started and formed the Breiðárlón  lagoon, which is not as dramatic as the Jökulsárlón lagoon.

The tongue of the Breiðamerkurjökull glacier is a major attraction for tourists. Tour operators conduct snowmobiles and jeep tours to visit the glacier along the winding iceberg studded Jökulsárlón lagoon. The base station for visits to the area is at Jöklasel , which is approached from Höfn. It is termed as Tourist Conveyor belt. While walking on the shore, the isolated big blocks of icebergs on the sand beaches can be seen.

The location has been used for many films and commercials. The glacier was used in Lara Croft: Tomb Raider as a stand-in for Siberia.

History
The first settlers arrived in Iceland around 900 AD when the edge of the glacier tongue of Breiðamerkurjökull glacier was about  further north of the present location. Since 1890, it has been retreating, retreating a total of  during the 20th century. With temperatures rising between 1920 and 1965, changes started occurring in the Breiðamerkurjökull glacier tongue. In 1933 or 1934 a proglacial lake or lagoon formed in the depression left where the retreating glacier had been. Since then, the lake, which is named Jökulsárlón, has grown larger as the glacier continues its retreat. Glacial moraines are exposed on both sides of the water. The tongue of the glacier floats in the lake and is calving into the water, producing floating icebergs of varying size.

Monitoring

The complex nature of glacial advance or retreat has been monitored in the last several decades. A study by D. Evans, published in Geography Review in 2002, reported on monitoring of the Breiðamerkurjökull between 1903 and 1998. The Breiðamerkurjökull east lobe and central lobe retreated at a slower average rate (28 m per year) between 1980 and 1998 than in earlier periods when retreat rates were as high as 50 m per year for the east lobe and 67 m per year for the central lobe. Retreat of the Breiðamerkurjökull west lobe was more uniform, averaging about 30 m per year, except in the period from 1945–65 when the rate of retreat averaged 62.5 m per year.

According to another study, a scarp capped by the Breiðamerkurjökull lobe of the larger Vatnajökull glacier was formed into terraces and barriers, enclosed by lagoons, on the east coast. On the northern side the Jökulsá river or lagoon emanating from the Breiðamerkurjökull, has its outlet to the sea and it has formed sand gravel barriers and the glacier front has retreated by 3 km in the period from 1945, 1965 and 1998.

See also
Retreat of glaciers since 1850

References

9. Google timelapse of Breiðamerkurjökull 1984-2016: https://earthengine.google.com/timelapse/#v=64.15306,-16.4,10,latLng&t=2.50

External links

 The active temperate glacial landsystem: a model based on Breiðamerkurjökull and Fjallsjökull, Iceland

Glaciers of Iceland